Mujibnagar is an upazila (subdistrict) of Meherpur District in Bangladesh.

History
Mujibnagar was formerly a part of the Meherpur Sadar Upazila, before it was made a separate Upazila on 22 February 2000. The name Mujibnagar commemorates an event in the history of Bangladesh: It is the place where, on 17 April 1971, the first government of the People's Republic of Bangladesh was sworn in, and the place was named Mujibnagar after the name of the Father of the nation Bangabandhu Sheikh Mujibur Rahman.

Geography
Mujibnagar Upazila is bounded by Meherpur Sadar Upazila in Meherpur District, on the north, Meherpur Sadar Upazila and Damurhuda Upazila, the latter in Chuadanga District, on the east,  and Tehatta I CD Block, in Nadia District, West Bengal, India, on the south and the west.

Demographics

According to the 2011 Bangladesh census, Mujibnagar Upazila had 24,602 households and a population of 99,143, 10.1% of whom lived in urban areas. 8.5% of the population was under the age of 5. The literacy rate (age 7 and over) was 50.5%, compared to the national average of 51.8%.

Administration
Meherpur Sadar Upazila is divided into four union parishads: Bagoan, Dariapur, Mahajanpur, and Monakhali. The union parishads are subdivided into 29 mauzas and 33 villages.

References

Upazilas of Meherpur District
Meherpur District
Khulna Division